The AEA Explorer (sometimes called the Explorer Explorer) is a large single-engine utility aircraft.

Design and development
The explorer is a single-engined strut-braced high-wing monoplane with a retractable tricycle landing gear that retracts into under-fuselage sponsons. The prototype, designated Explorer 350R first flew in 1998 and was soon exhibited on promotional tours of Australia and the United States.

The Explorer is  being offered in two versions – the turboprop-powered version, the 500T (which first flew in 2000), and a stretched version of the 500T, designated 750T.

Explorer Aircraft was established in Jasper, Texas to market the aircraft for the US market.

Specifications AEA 500T

See also

References

 Jackson, Paul. Jane's All The World's Aircraft 2003–2004. Coulsdon, UK: Jane's Information Group, 2003. .

External links

Explorer Aircraft website (actual)
The Explorer on AEA's website (the arcive oldwebs ite)

Explorer
1990s Australian civil utility aircraft